St John the Baptist Church, Yaverland is a parish church in the Church of England located in Yaverland, Isle of Wight.

History

The church is medieval dating from the twelfth century.

List of incumbents

Legh Richmond 1798–1805

Parish Status

The church is within a group which includes:
St John the Baptist Church, Yaverland
St Mary's Church, Brading

Organ

The church has a pipe organ by William Hill dating from 1889. A specification of the organ can be found on the National Pipe Organ Register.

Gallery

References

Church of England church buildings on the Isle of Wight